Yasar İsmailoğlu (born 1945 in Limassol, Cyprus) is a Turkish-Cypriot poet, writer and journalist who emigrated to London in 1972 after the 1971 military coup in Turkey. İsmailoğlu writes in Turkish and English.

Poetry
The Barbarian. 1965.
The Daughter of Steps (Step Kızı). 1968.
Cyprus I Loved You So. 1980.
Yarımın Acısı (Anguish of my half). 1995.
The Pain of my Other Part/Why Aphrodite Why? 1995.
To Whom I Could Die (Oyy Sevdasına Kurban Olduğum). 1997.
Uzaklaşan Sesler. 2000.
Ayisigi Golgesinde Erosa Yolculuk. London: Siirler, 2004.

References

External links
İsmailoğlu reading his work. Museum of London.

1945 births
Living people
People from Limassol
Turkish Cypriot columnists
Turkish Cypriot poets
Turkish Cypriot political writers
Alumni of the University of London